James Houston Johnson Jr. (born December 16, 1937) is a retired lieutenant general in the United States Army. He has over 33 years of active military service, culminating as Commanding General of the First United States Army, responsible for 325,000 soldiers, from 1991 to 1993.

Personal life
Johnson was born on December 16, 1937 in Tuscaloosa, Alabama. He graduated from the United States Military Academy at West Point, New York, in 1960 and was commissioned in the infantry. He is also a graduate of the Armor Career Course, the Armed Forces Staff College and the Army War College. He attained a Master of Science degree in Public Administration from Shippensburg State College in 1979.

Military career
Johnson served as a troop leader in the 82nd Airborne Division at every level, from Rifle Platoon Leader to Airborne Division Commander. He commanded the 505th Parachute Infantry Regiment for three years, longer than anyone in the history of the Regiment, from 1980 to 1983. He commanded the 82nd Airborne Division longer than anyone since World War II, from 1988 to 1991.

During his career, he was in combat on four separate occasions. This includes two tours in Vietnam: first, as an Advisor in the Mekong Delta in 1966 to 1967 and, later, as an Infantry Battalion S3 with the 101st Airborne Division (Air Assault), operating in the Ruong-Ruong Valley, just south of the Demilitarized Zone (DMZ) in 1969 to 1970.

As Assistant Division Commander for Operations of the 82nd Airborne Division, Johnson commanded all Army Forces during Operation Golden Pheasant, a show of force in Horduras in 1988.

As Commanding General of the 82nd Airborne Division, he became the only modern-day Commander to lead a division in combat in two separate conflicts. In 1989, he was the first jumper during the night airborne assault of Panama, known as Operation Just Cause. In 1990 to 1991, he led the division during Operations Desert Shield and Desert Storm in the Persian Gulf.

Awards and decorations
Among his military awards and decorations, Johnson was awarded the Army Distinguished Service Medal (with one OLC), the Legion of Merit (with one OLC), the Bronze Star Medal (with one OLC), the Meritorious Service Medal (with two OLC), the Army Commendation Medal (with three OLC) and the Air Medal (with one OLC). Johnson earned the Combat Infantry Badge, the Expert Infantry Badge, the Master Parachutist Badge with Gold Combat Star, the Ranger Tab, the Jungle Expert Patch and the Army Staff Identification Badge. He also received British and Egyptian parachutist badges.

In 2019, Johnson was inducted into the 82nd Airborne Division's Hall of Fame.

Post-military life
After retirement from active duty in 1993, Johnson's service to the Nation continued in the Balkans as Director of a Joint Civil-Military Training Program for the Croatian Armed Forces.  Later, he served as the Secretary of Defense's personal representative to the Former Soviet Republics of Kasakhstan and Uzbekistan in Central Asia.

Since 2000, Johnson has served as the Honorary Colonel of the Regiment to the 505th Parachute Infantry Regiment.

References

1937 births
Living people
People from Tuscaloosa, Alabama
United States Military Academy alumni
United States Army Rangers
United States Army personnel of the Vietnam War
Shippensburg University of Pennsylvania alumni
United States Army personnel of the Gulf War
Recipients of the Legion of Merit
United States Army generals
Recipients of the Distinguished Service Medal (US Army)